The International Volleyball Hall of Fame (IVHF) was founded to honor extraordinary players, coaches, officials, and leaders who have made significant contributions to the game of volleyball. The Hall of Fame is located in Holyoke, Massachusetts, where volleyball was invented in 1895 by William G. Morgan at the local YMCA.

History 
In 1971 the Greater Holyoke Chamber of Commerce established a committee to campaign for the founding of the Volleyball Hall of Fame in Holyoke, Massachusetts.

By 1977 signs had been set up as people entered the city touting Holyoke, as the "Home of the Volleyball Hall of Fame", however for years newspapers would write stories lampooning the city as people attempted to find it, only to see a small display case of memorabilia that alternated between being hosted by the Chamber of Commerce and Wistariahurst Museum. In 1978, the committee incorporated as Holyoke Volleyball Hall of Fame, Inc., a nonprofit corporation established for the purpose of planning, promoting, establishing and maintaining a living memorial to the sport of volleyball. The name of the corporation was changed to the International Volleyball Hall of Fame by resolution of the Board of Directors on July 17, 2014.

A small exhibit dedicated to the history of volleyball and the hall of fame's inductees opened in a  section of the renovated Skinner Mill Warehouse on June 6, 1987 - a building built in 1949 to store silk fabric produced by the famous Skinner Mill in Holyoke. The mill itself was destroyed by fire in 1980.

In 1998, the exhibit was expanded and moved to a permanent  location in the Skinner Mill Warehouse in downtown Holyoke's Heritage State Park sharing the building with the Holyoke Children's Museum.

The IVHF museum now features exhibits honoring each year's inductees, a replica of a full-size volleyball court, sport timelines, photos, and unique and meaningful memorabilia of the sport along with an interactive video kiosk, a special inductee display area, and a gift shop.

In 1985, William G. Morgan (inventor of volleyball) was posthumously inducted into the hall as its first member. A total of 140 men and women from 25 countries around the world have since been inducted into the International Volleyball Hall of Fame.

Current inductees (147 persons) 
The following tables, pre-sorted chronologically, enumerate all of the inductees to the Volleyball Hall of Fame through 2019.

Male volleyball players (58 persons)

1988–1999 (13 persons)

2000–2009 (22 persons)

2010–2019 (22 persons)

2020–2029 (1 persons)

Female volleyball players (40 persons)

1988–1999 (8 persons)

2000–2009 (14 persons)

2010–2019 (18 persons)

Volleyball coaches (26 persons)

1988–1999 (10 persons)

2000–2009 (8 persons)

2010–2019 (8 persons)

Volleyball leaders and officials (23 persons)

1985–1999 (14 persons)

2000–2019 (9 persons)

Inductees by country (25 countries) 
The following table enumerates all of the inductees to the Volleyball Hall of Fame through 2018.

See also

 Major achievements in volleyball by nation
 Fédération Internationale de Volleyball

References

External links
 International Volleyball Hall of Fame - official website

Volleyball museums and halls of fame
Hall
Halls of fame in Massachusetts
Sports museums in Massachusetts
Museums in Hampden County, Massachusetts
International Sports Heritage Association
Buildings and structures in Holyoke, Massachusetts
Sports in Holyoke, Massachusetts
1978 establishments in Massachusetts